Brian Markinson (born September 1, 1961) is an American-Canadian actor who has appeared in a wide variety of films and television shows. Some of Markinson's best known roles include a U.S. Attorney General in Shooter, an unscrupulous industrialist in Godzilla, and a supporting role in Angels in America.

Personal life
Born in Brooklyn, New York into a Jewish family, Markinson trained at the Royal Central School of Speech and Drama and subsequently graduated from the American Academy of Dramatic Arts in 1983. He married Canadian Nancy Kerr, and their sons Isaac and Evan were both born in Los Angeles in the late 1990s.  In 1999 the family moved to Vancouver, British Columbia, Canada, where they have resided since.

Career

Throughout his career, Markinson has appeared in many American and Canadian film and television projects. He frequently plays either an authority figure or a calculating or menacing villain. One of his most prominent roles was as Police Chief Bill Jacobs on Da Vinci's Inquest and Da Vinci's City Hall. He has also appeared on Continuum, Arctic Air, Traveler, NCIS, The L Word, NYPD Blue, Psych, Supernatural, Touching Evil, Taken, Dark Angel, UC: Undercover, Stargate SG-1, Star Trek: The Next Generation, Star Trek: Deep Space Nine, Star Trek: Voyager, The X-Files, Millennium, Mad Men, Fargo, the TV film Lucky 7.

Markinson had appeared in three straight Woody Allen films in supporting character roles: Sweet and Lowdown in 1999, Small Time Crooks in 2000 and The Curse of the Jade Scorpion in 2001. Markinson was also a favorite of Mike Nichols, having appeared in more than six of the late director's projects, including the film Charlie Wilson's War. Markinson is also a stage actor, having performed both on Broadway, Off-Broadway and in regional theatres across Canada; On Broadway, he replaced Kevin Spacey in Lost In Yonkers and in 2016, he led the revival of Tony Kushner's Angels in America at the Arts Club Theatre Company in Vancouver.

Filmography

References

External links
 
 

Living people
American expatriate male actors in Canada
Canadian male film actors
Canadian male television actors
Male actors from New York City
1961 births
Male actors from Vancouver
20th-century American male actors
20th-century Canadian male actors
21st-century American male actors
21st-century Canadian male actors
American male film actors
American male television actors
Jewish American male actors
Jewish Canadian male actors
21st-century American Jews